This is a summary, listing every former class of preserved ex-British Rail diesel locomotives.

For detailed information, see the page for the relevant class.

Diesel Shunters
Small shunters
 British Rail Class D2/10 - 2 preserved
 British Rail Class D2/11 - 1 preserved
 British Rail Class D2/12 - 1 preserved
 British Rail Class 01 - 2 preserved
 British Rail Class 02 - 7 preserved
 British Rail Class 03 - 56 preserved
 British Rail Class 04 - 18 preserved
 British Rail Class 05 - 4 preserved
 British Rail Class 06 - 1 preserved, 
 British Rail Class 07 - 7 preserved
Large shunters
 British Rail Class D3/6 - 1 preserved
 British Rail Class 08 - 87 preserved

 British Rail Class 09 - 12 preserved
 British Rail Class 10 - 4 preserved
 British Rail Class 11 - 8 preserved
 British Rail Class 12 - 1 preserved
 British Rail Class 97/6 - 3 preserved

Type 1
 British Rail Class 14 - 19 preserved
 British Rail Class 15 - 1 preserved
 British Rail Class 17 - 1 preserved
 British Rail Class 20 - 22 preserved

Type 2
 British Rail Class 23 - no locomotive preserved but one Napier Deltic T9-29 engine preserved
 British Rail Class 24 - 4 preserved
 British Rail Class 25 - 20 preserved
 British Rail Class 26 - 13 preserved
 British Rail Class 27 - 8 preserved
 British Rail Class 28 - 1 preserved
 British Rail Class 31 - 26 preserved

Type 3
 British Rail Class 33 - 29 preserved
 British Rail Class 35 - 4 preserved
 British Rail Class 37 - 35 preserved

Type 4
 British Rail Class 40 - 7 preserved
 British Rail Class 42 - 2 preserved
 British Rail Class 44 - 2 preserved
 British Rail Class 45 - 12 preserved
 British Rail Class 46 - 3 preserved
 British Rail Class 47 - 31 preserved

 British Rail Class 48 - 1 preserved
 British Rail Class 50 - 18 preserved
 British Rail Class 52 - 7 preserved

Type 5
 British Rail Class 55 - 6 preserved
 British Rail Class 56 - 3 preserved
 British Rail Class 58 - 5 preserved, so far

High Speed Train
 British Rail Class 41 (HST) - 1 preserved
 British Rail Class 43 (HST) - 7 preserved

Demonstrators
These locomotives worked on British Railways as demonstrators but remained in the ownership of the manufacturers:
NBL/Paxman 0-4-0 diesel-hydraulic
 Tiger - preserved at Bo'ness and Kinneil Railway
 Tom - preserved at Telford Steam Railway

English Electric
 British Railways D0226 - preserved at Keighley and Worth Valley Railway
 British Railways DP1 - preserved at Shildon Locomotion Museum

See also
 List of British Rail power classifications

References

British Rail diesel locomotives
British Rail